was a town in Shiga District, Shiga Prefecture, Japan. It was on the western shore of Lake Biwa and the eastern foot of Hira Mountains.

On March 20, 2006, Shiga was merged into the expanded city of Ōtsu.

The original village called Shiga (滋賀 instead of 志賀) was slightly north of Ōtsu and merged with Ōtsu on May 10, 1932.

2006 disestablishments in Japan
Populated places disestablished in 2006
Dissolved municipalities of Shiga Prefecture
Ōtsu